Bjorli (or Bjørli) is a village in Lesja Municipality in Innlandet county, Norway. It lies along the Rauma river near the municipal border with Rauma Municipality.

Bjorli is served by the Bjorli Station on the Raumabanen railway line providing a convenient method for tourists to reach this destination. A large restaurant was built in 1927 at the rail station to service passengers of cruise ships from the port at Åndalsnes on Romsdalsfjord. It later burnt down and was not rebuilt.

The major tourist attractions at Bjorli include: 
 Bjorli Ski Center, with early snow, 1 chair lift serving  of vertical drop, and numerous cross-country ski trails. 
 Dovrefjell-Sunndalsfjella National Park's mountains make for spectacular hiking during the summer and skiing in the winter. Due to rather long walks between unstaffed huts and harsh, unstable weather conditions, this area is recommended for experienced hikers only.

Because of its unique mountainous terrain, this is the filming location for one scene in the Harry Potter movie Harry Potter and the Half-Blood Prince which came out in July 2009 in the United Kingdom and United States.

References and notes

External links
 Bjorli Ski-Center  
 Bjorli - Lesja Reiseliv AS  
 Weather forecast for Bjorli  
 More general info about Bjorli

Lesja
Villages in Innlandet
Ski areas and resorts in Norway